North Stainley with Sleningford is a civil parish in Harrogate district, North Yorkshire, England.  The principal settlement and only village in the parish is North Stainley.  The parish also includes the small settlements of Sleningford, North Lees and Sutton Grange.  The Lightwater Valley theme park is also in the parish.

The parish is bounded on the north and east by the River Ure, and on the south by the city of Ripon.

North Stainley with Sleningford was historically a township in the ancient parish of Ripon in the West Riding of Yorkshire.  It became a civil parish in 1866.  It was transferred to North Yorkshire in 1974.  In 1988 the parish absorbed the small civil parish of Sutton Grange.

References 

Civil parishes in North Yorkshire